Camilla Waldman (born 22 February 1968) is a South African actress, best known for her role as Anne de Villiers, the Madam of a high-class brothel, on the SABC1 soapie Generations, from March 2004 to June 2008.

Career
Waldman completed a BA in drama and a Performer's Diploma, graduating cum laude from the University of Cape Town. She then joined the Jazzart Dance Theatre Company and performed with them for two years.

Waldman has appeared in The Fall (2006), Dead Easy (2004) and Berserker.

In 2011, she was cast as Teresa de' Medici in the TV series Leonardo. The first season of Leonardo was shot on location in South Africa throughout the second half of 2010. A second season was completed on location in Cape Town and was aired in 2012. It was announced on 21 January 2013 that Leonardo would not be recommissioned for a third season.

Personal life
She was formerly married to actor Jamie Bartlett. The couple had a son, Hector, and later divorced.

Filmography

References

External links
 

1968 births
Living people
Place of birth missing (living people)
British television actresses
University of Cape Town alumni